Oppah Chamu Zvipange Muchinguri-Kashiri (born 14 December 1958) is a Zimbabwean politician who serves as minister of defence in the cabinet of Zimbabwe since 2018. She has also served as Minister of Higher Education and Minister of Women's Affairs. Muchinguri ran as the ZANU-PF candidate for Mutasa Central constituency in the March 2008 parliamentary election, but was defeated by Trevor Saruwaka of the Movement for Democratic Change – Tsvangirai. According to official results, Muchinguri received 4,764 votes against 9,228 votes for Saruwaka.

The Herald reported on 3 January 2009, that Muchinguri had been dismissed from the Cabinet earlier in the week, along with 11 other ministers, because she no longer held any seat in Parliament.

She was re-appointed to cabinet in 2014 following the dismissal of former Vice-President Joice Mujuru and several of her allies, in December 2014. In 2015 she was moved to the Ministry of Environment, Water and Climate in a cabinet reshuffle. On 27 November 2017, Mugabe's successor Emmerson Mnangagwa dissolved the cabinet

She was appointed as the Minister of Environment, Water and Climate again on 30 November 2017. She was later appointed Minister of Defense in September 2018.

She was placed on the United States sanctions list in 2003. In 2020 she claimed that the COVID-19 pandemic was God's punishment on the countries (USA etc.) that "suffocate" Zimbabwe by sanctions.

In January 2021 Muchinguri was condemned by public health experts in Zimbabwe after accusing China of "botched experiments" that were responsible for the outbreak of the coronavirus pandemic in the world after Zimbabwe lost 2 cabinet ministers.

References 

1958 births
Living people
Defence Ministers of Zimbabwe
Education ministers of Zimbabwe
Environment ministers of Zimbabwe
Female defence ministers

Members of the National Assembly of Zimbabwe
Specially Designated Nationals and Blocked Persons List
Women government ministers of Zimbabwe
ZANU–PF politicians